The 1949–50 Washington Huskies men's basketball team represented the University of Washington for the  NCAA college basketball season. Led by third-year head coach Art McLarney, the Huskies were members of the Pacific Coast Conference and played their home games on campus at Hec Edmundson Pavilion in Seattle, Washington.

McLarney resigned after the season due to ill health, and was succeeded in early June by Tippy Dye, the head coach at

References

External links
Sports Reference – Washington Huskies: 1949–50 basketball season

Washington Huskies men's basketball seasons
Washington Huskies
Washington
Washington